Motor transport (MT) refers to the operation and maintenance of a military vehicle fleet (especially trucks), and sometimes to the servicemembers to operate and maintain them. Traditionally, motor transport organizations are responsible for a unit's military trucks and associated equipment, as well as the transport of personnel and material from one place to another. In a unit employing towed artillery, motor transport provides the prime movers.

See also
 List of U.S. military vehicles by model number
 Transportation Corps (United States Army)
 Motor Transport Corps (United States Army) (World War One)
 6th Motor Transport Battalion
 Army engineering maintenance

Military trucks
Military logistics